Sri Kanyaka Parameshwari (SKP) Govt and PG Degree College is a college in Guntakal, Andhra Pradesh, India. It is affiliated to Sri Krishnadevaraya University.  It has graduated at least 10 classes up through 2012.

References

External links
"SKP Government Degree College, Guntakal, Andhra Pradesh"

Colleges in Andhra Pradesh
Universities and colleges in Anantapur district
Educational institutions established in 1968
1968 establishments in Andhra Pradesh